Emmy Albus Liersch (13 December 1911 – 20 September 1995) was a German sprinter who won a gold medal in 4 × 100 m relay at the 1938 European Championships, the same year she set a world record in the 4 × 200 m relay.

At the 1936 Berlin Olympics her 4 × 100 m team set a world record in the semifinals and led the final until a missed exchange in the final leg.  Individually, she finished sixth in the 100 m event.

In 1958 Albus married Walter Liersch, a fellow German sprinter.

References

1911 births
1995 deaths
German female sprinters
Athletes (track and field) at the 1936 Summer Olympics
Olympic athletes of Germany
European Athletics Championships medalists
Sportspeople from Wuppertal
Olympic female sprinters